Sheikh Jana (earlier Raam Jana) is a town near Shewa Adda and Union Council of Swabi District in Khyber-Pakhtunkhwa, Pakistan. Sheikh Jana is an old and historic village of Swabi. The old name was due to Raam (Bhagwaan), which was placed in the center of the village. Before Partition, Sheikh Jana was a Hindu majority village.

Sheikh Jana is situated 15 km far from Swabi Center. It borders Kernel Sher Kalli (Nawi Kalli), Spin Kanri, Shewa Kalli, Asota Sharif and Mansabdar.

Demographics 
The population is approximately 40,000. After Partition, all Hindus of that area migrated to India. Their worship places are present in the area. The majority of residents are Yousafzai people. Some residents migrated from other places.

The people are mostly middle lower class.

Economy 
The main source of income is agriculture. Main corps grown here are Wheat, Corn and Tobacco. Many former residents work abroad, mostly in KSA and UAE. Others hold government jobs including teachers, police, health workers and other departments. There is also a group of construction workers.

Culture 
The main games are kabaddi and cricket. Some people play football and badminton.
The main mohallas are Kara Khel, Shahi Khel, Ahmad Khel, Landay Cham, Nako Khel, Ali Sher Khel, Gharay Cham, Ismail Khel,  Saif Ud Din Khel and Shobla Cham.

Education 
There is one higher secondary school for boys and one high school for girls. Two private schools educate boys and girls separately.

References

Populated places in Swabi District